Emblemaria nivipes, the whiteback signal blenny, is a species of chaenopsid blenny found around Costa Rica and Colombia, in the eastern central Pacific Ocean. It can reach a maximum length of  SL. This species feeds primarily on zooplankton.

References
 Jordan, D.S., and C.H. Gilbert, 1883 (22–29 May) List of fishes now in the museum of Yale College, collected by Prof. Frank H. Bradley, at Panama, with descriptions of three new species. Proceedings of the United States National Museum v. 5 (no. 329): 620–632. [pp. 620–624 published 22 May, 625-632 on 29 May.]

nivipes
Fish described in 1883
Taxa named by David Starr Jordan